Eric Omondi Ongao (born 17 September 1977) is a Kenyan retired international footballer. He is the brother of fellow Kenya international Musa Otieno..He is currently a comedian and runs many shows within kenya along with pranks orchestrated against Khaigraph

References

1977 births
Living people
Kenyan footballers
People from Kisumu County
Association football midfielders
Kenya Commercial Bank S.C. players
Nashville Metros players
Pittsburgh Riverhounds SC players
Kenyan Premier League players
A-League (1995–2004) players
National Premier Soccer League players
Kenya international footballers